Koni or KONI is:

 Koni, Ivory Coast, a town
 Koni-class frigate, a class of Soviet frigates
 KONI (FM), a radio station located in Lanai City, Hawaii
 Koni or Kony (film), a 1986 Bengali film directed by Saroj Dey
 The KONI Group, a Dutch manufacturer of automobile shock absorbers and subsidiary of ITT Corporation
 The KONI Challenge Series, formerly the Grand-Am Cup series, a touring car racing series
 National Sports Committee of Indonesia (Komite Olahraga Nasional Indonesia), abbreviated KONI
 a synonym for Xalam, a stringed musical instrument
 Koni the Giant Boy, a Japanese cartoon that aired on TV Tokyo
 Koni Iguan (born 1969), Papua New Guinean politician
 Koni (novel), a Bengali novel by Moti Nandi

See also
Connie (disambiguation)
Conny
Konni (disambiguation)